Luis Filosa (born 15 February 1973) is a Venezuelan former footballer. He played in 30 matches for the Venezuela national football team from 1993 to 2000. He was also part of Venezuela's squad for the 1993 Copa América tournament.

References

External links
 

1973 births
Living people
Venezuelan footballers
Venezuela international footballers
Place of birth missing (living people)
Association football defenders
A.C.C.D. Mineros de Guayana players
UA Maracaibo players
Deportivo Miranda F.C. players